Jim Denison (born 1958) is an American author, speaker, and the CEO of Denison Ministries.

Early life and education 
Denison was born in 1958. He has both a Ph.D. in Philosophy of Religion and a Master of Divinity from Southwestern Baptist Theological Seminary and a Doctor of Divinity degree from Dallas Baptist University.

Career 
Denison was the senior pastor of Park Cities Baptist Church in Dallas, Texas, from 1998 to 2009. He served as pastor of Second-Ponce de Leon Baptist Church in Atlanta from 1994 to 1998, and from 1988 to 1994, he pastored First Baptist Church Midland.

In February 2009, he cofounded Denison Forum, one of four brands within Denison Ministries. It was formerly known as the Center for Informed Faith, an independent ministry hosted by the Baptist General Convention of Texas.

Denison writes The Daily Article, a weekday email newsletter that comments on current issues through a biblical lens, and cohosts The Denison Forum Podcast.
He holds a number of fellowships, including:
 Resident Scholar for Ethics with Baylor Scott & White Health 
 Senior Fellow with the 21st Century Wilberforce Initiative  
 Scholar Fellow with CEO Forum
 Senior Fellow for Global Studies at Dallas Baptist University
 Senior Fellow with the International Association of Christian Educators
Denison has spoken on the topics of radical Islam, geopolitics, and medical ethics.

Selected publications 
Denison's perspectives have been published in the Huffington Post, Religion News, the Baptist Standard, Fox News, Patheos, the Dallas Morning News, Baptist News Global, Faithwire, and the Christian Post.

He is the author of multiple books:

 The Coming Tsunami: Why Christians Are Labeled Intolerant, Irrelevant, Oppressive, and Dangerous—and How We Can Turn the Tide
 Respectfully, I Disagree: How to Be a Civil Person in an Uncivil Time
 How Does God See America?
 Biblical Insight to Tough Questions: Vols. 1–10
 Bright Hope for Tomorrow: How Jesus' Parables Illuminate Our Darkest Days
 Radical Islam: What You Need to Know  
 The Bible -- You Can Believe It: Biblical Authority in the Twenty-First Century
 Myth and the Manger
 Life on the Brick Pile: Answers to Suffering from the Letters of Revelation
 Seven Crucial Questions About the Bible

Personal life 
Denison and his wife, Janet, live in Dallas, Texas. They have two married sons and four grandchildren.

References

External links
The Denison Forum

American evangelicals
Christian apologists
Clergy from Houston
Academics from Houston
Southwestern Baptist Theological Seminary alumni
Southwestern Baptist Theological Seminary faculty
Dallas Baptist University alumni
1958 births
Living people